Dypsis singularis is a species of flowering plant in the Palm Family (Arecaceae or Palmae). It is found only on the island of  Madagascar. It is threatened by habitat loss. It is remarkable for its height to width ratio; the greatest of any tree.  It is up to 19ft 8in (six meters) tall while being only 2/5ths of a inch (one cm) in diameter, a length/width ratio of 600 fold.

References

singularis
Endemic flora of Madagascar
Critically endangered plants
Taxonomy articles created by Polbot
Taxa named by Henk Jaap Beentje